This is a list of ratites.

Codes used in Status columns in tables below
 Extinct (EX) – No known living individuals
 Extinct in the wild (EW) – Known only to survive in captivity, or as a naturalized population outside its historic range
 Critically endangered (CR) – Extremely high risk of extinction in the wild
 Endangered (EN) – Higher risk of extinction in the wild
 Vulnerable (VU) – High risk of extinction in the wild
 Near threatened (NT) – Likely to become endangered in the near future
 Conservation Dependent (CD)  – Low risk; is conserved to prevent being near threatened, certain events may lead it to being a higher risk level
 Least concern (LC) – Very Low risk; does not qualify for a higher risk category and not likely to be threatened in the near future. Widespread and abundant taxa are included in this category.

Struthionidae

Struthio

Rheidae

Rhea

Apterygidae

Apteryx

Dinornithidae

Dinornis

Megalapteryx

Anomalopteryx

Euryapteryx

Emeus

Pachyornis

Dromaiidae

Dromaius

Casuariidae

Casuarius

Aepyornithidae

Aepyornis

Mullerornis

References